Tenderness may refer to:

Films
 Tenderness (2009 film), a 2009 American crime film
 Tenderness (2017 film), a 2017 Italian film also known as La tenerezza

Medicine
 Rebound tenderness, a clinical sign that a doctor may detect in physical examination of a patient's abdomen
 Tenderness (medicine), pain or discomfort when an affected area is touched

Music

Songs
 "Tenderness" (song), a song by General Public from their 1984 album All the Rage		
 "Tenderness", a song by Steppenwolf from the 1971 album For Ladies Only
 "Tenderness", a song by Paul Simon from the 1973 album There Goes Rhymin' Simon
 "Tenderness", a song by Diana Ross from the 1980 album diana
 "Tenderness", a song by Laura Branigan from the 1985 album Hold Me
 "Tenderness", a song by Janis Ian from the 1995 album Revenge

Albums
 Tenderness (Blue Hawaii album), 2017
 Tenderness (Walt Dickerson and Richard Davis album), 1985
 Tenderness (Kip Hanrahan album), 1990
 Tenderness (Al Jarreau album), 1994
 Tenderness (Duff McKagan album), 2019
 Tenderness (J. D. Souther album), 2015
 Tenderness, a 1981 album by the Ohio Players
 Tenderness, a 1998 album by Kristine

Other uses
 Hardiness (plants) (in)ability to withstand freezing temperatures
 Meat tenderness, a gauge of meat palatability
 Tenderness (novel), by Robert Cormier
 Tenderness (sculpture), a marble sculpture by Canadian Paul Lancz

See also
 Tender (disambiguation)
 Term of endearment
 Affection
 Care (disambiguation)
 Kindness
 Love